is a Japanese bobsledder. He competed in the 1972 and 1976 Winter Olympics.

References

1947 births
Living people
Bobsledders at the 1972 Winter Olympics
Bobsledders at the 1976 Winter Olympics
Japanese male bobsledders
Olympic bobsledders of Japan